Lac de Souliers is a lake in Hautes-Alpes, France.

It is located in the commune of Château-Ville-Vieille, under the Col d'Izoard.

Souliers